Jusman Syafii Djamal (Born in Langsa, East Aceh, Aceh, Indonesia July 28, 1954) is the former Minister of Transportation of Indonesia, serving between 2007 and 2009.

References

1954 births
Bandung Institute of Technology alumni
Transport ministers of Indonesia
Living people
People from Langsa